John Stewart MacMillan (born October 25, 1935) is a Canadian retired ice hockey forward. He played 104 games in the National Hockey League with the Toronto Maple Leafs and Detroit Red Wings between 1960 and 1964. The rest of his career, which lasted from 1960 to 1971, was spent in various minor leagues.

Playing career
MacMillan began his National Hockey League career with the Toronto Maple Leafs in 1960. He would also play with the Detroit Red Wings.  Macmillan left the NHL following the 1965 season and retired from hockey altogether in 1971. He won 2 Stanley Cups with the Toronto Maple Leafs in 1962 and 1963.

MacMillan led the University of Denver to NCAA Championships in 1958 and 1960.

Post-playing career
After hockey, MacMillan was a licensed professional engineer working in the state of Tennessee.  His Tennessee licence number was 9708.

Career statistics

Regular season and playoffs

Awards and honors

References

External links 
 

1935 births
Living people
Canadian ice hockey forwards
Detroit Red Wings players
Ice hockey people from Alberta
Memphis Wings players
NCAA men's ice hockey national champions
Pittsburgh Hornets players
Rochester Americans players
St. Paul Rangers players
San Diego Gulls (WHL) players
Sportspeople from Lethbridge
Stanley Cup champions
Toronto Maple Leafs players